Lost and Found is a Marathi film produced by Vinod Malgewar under banner Golden Gate Motion Pictures. The movie is written and directed by Ruturaj Dhalgade, starring Spruha Joshi, Siddharth Chandekar, Mohan Agashe and Mangesh Desai.‘Lost & Found’ is a love story with difference of opinions.

Plot 
Lost & Found is basically a love story of Manas (Siddharth Chandekar) and Naina (Spruha Joshi) dealing with loneliness in their personal lives. Since loneliness has become a prominent part of our urban lives, Lost & Found empathizes ignored human emotions with a basic motive of bringing happiness in the lives of lonely people. The four characters – Manas, Naina, Maruti (Mangesh Desai) & Shrirang Kaka (Mohan Agashe) take an initiative against loneliness and thereby resurrecting their own lonely lives.

Cast 

 Siddharth Chandekar as Manas
 Spruha Joshi as Naina
 Mohan Agashe as Shrirang Kaka
 Mangesh Desai as Maruti
Tejaswi Patil as Aparna
Ritika Shrotri as Leena
Gauri Konge as Mughda
Shubhangi Damle as Nene Kaku

Soundtrack 
The film's soundtrack is composed by Shubhankar Shembekar with lyrics penned by Dr.Rahul Deshpande & Spruha Joshi.

References

External links 
 
 

2010s Marathi-language films
2016 films
Indian drama films